Huandoval District is one of eleven districts of the Pallasca Province in Peru.

See also
 P'itiqucha
 Pusaqqucha

References

Districts of the Pallasca Province
Districts of the Ancash Region